Lamprosiella is a monotypic moth genus in the subfamily Arctiinae erected by R. J. Collins in 1962. Its only species, Lamprosiella eborella, was described by Jean Baptiste Boisduval in 1847. It is found in South Africa and Tanzania.

References

 

Lithosiini
Moths described in 1847
Monotypic moth genera